The Wicked Girls is a book written by Alex Marwood (pseudonym adopted by Serena Mackesy) and published by Sphere Books (an imprint of Little, Brown and Company) on 16 February 2012 which later went on to win the Edgar Award for Best Paperback Original in 2014.

References 

Edgar Award-winning works
British mystery novels
British thriller novels
2012 British novels
Sphere Books books